The Mannerelle River is a tributary of the Malouin River, flowing into the municipality of Eeyou Istchee Baie-James (municipality), in the administrative region of Nord-du-Québec, in Quebec, in Canada. Its course crosses the cantons of Massicotte and Manthet.

The surface of the river is usually frozen from early November to mid-May, however, safe ice movement is generally from mid-November to the end of April.

Geography 
The main hydrographic slopes near the Mannerelle River are:
North side: Harricana River, Malouin River;
East side: Harricana River, Malouin River, Breynat River, Despreux River;
South side: Turgeon River (Eeyou Istchee James Bay), Detour River;
West side: Again River (Ontario), Corner River (Ontario), Kattawagami River (Ontario).

The Mannerelle River originates at the mouth of Manthet Lake (length: ,), in the southern part of the Eeyou Istchee James Bay (Municipality).

The source of the Mannerelle River is located at:
 East of the Ontario border;
 South of the mouth of the Mannerelle River;
 West of downtown Matagami;
 South-East of the mouth of the Harricana River.

From its source, the Mannerelle River flows more or less parallel to the Ontario border over  according to the following segments:
 towards the North, until the discharge (coming from the South-East) of lakes Nicolas and Arquet;
 Northward, to a stream (coming from the Southwest);
 Northward, up to a river bend;
 Northeasterly from marsh zone to river bend;
 Northward in swamp area, to the mouth.

Toponymy 
The hydronym "Mannerelle River" was formalized on December 5, 1968, by the Commission de toponymie du Québec, at the creation of this commission.

Notes and references

See also 

Eeyou Istchee Baie-James (municipality), a municipality
Jamésie, a region
Harricana River, a watercourse
Malouin River, a watercourse
James Bay, a body of water
List of rivers of Quebec

Rivers of Nord-du-Québec